Cluxton is a surname. Notable people with the surname include:

Stephen Cluxton (born 1981), Irish Gaelic footballer
William Cluxton (1819–1901), Canadian businessman and political figure

See also
Claxton (surname)